Parliamentary elections were held in the Seychelles on 6 December 1987 for the People's Assembly. The Seychelles People's Progressive Front was the sole legal party at the time, and all candidates were members. Thirty-six candidates stood for 23 seats, 10 of them unopposed. A further two members were appointed by President France-Albert René.

Results

References

1987 in Seychelles
Elections in Seychelles
One-party elections
Seychelles
Election and referendum articles with incomplete results